Creed II is a 2018 American sports drama film directed by Steven Caple Jr. from a screenplay by Juel Taylor and Sylvester Stallone. It is the sequel to Creed (2015) and the eighth installment in the Rocky film series. It stars Michael B. Jordan, Stallone, Tessa Thompson, Wood Harris, Phylicia Rashad, Florian Munteanu, and Dolph Lundgren. In the film, under the continued tutelage of Rocky Balboa (Stallone), Adonis Creed (Jordan) faces off against Viktor Drago (Munteanu), the son of Ivan Drago (Lundgren).

A Creed sequel was confirmed in January 2016, but was delayed because Creed director Ryan Coogler and Jordan faced scheduling conflicts due to their involvement in Black Panther (2018). Coogler was originally replaced by Stallone, who completed the screenplay by July 2017, but he was replaced by Caple that December, with Coogler instead serving as an executive producer. The rest of the cast, including the returns of Thompson, Rashad, and Lundgren, was confirmed by March 2018. Principal photography lasted from March to June, primarily on location in Philadelphia.

Creed II premiered on November 14, 2018, at the Lincoln Center in New York City and was released in the United States by Mirror Releasing and internationally by Warner Bros. Pictures on November 21. The film received generally positive reviews from critics, who praised the performances (particularly those of Stallone, Jordan, and Lundgren), character development, and Caple's direction, while noting its predictability. It was also a commercial success, grossing $214 million worldwide.

The sequel, Creed III, directed by Jordan in his directorial debut, released March 3, 2023.

Plot 
In 2017, two years after his loss to "Pretty" Ricky Conlan, Adonis "Donnie" Creed, alongside his trainer Rocky Balboa, has won six straight bouts, culminating in a victory over Danny "Stuntman" Wheeler to win the WBC World Heavyweight Championship, and reclaimed his 1967 Ford Mustang that he had lost to Wheeler in a bet. Now a worldwide star, Donnie proposes marriage to his girlfriend, Bianca Taylor, who agrees. Bianca suggests starting a new life together in Los Angeles, but Donnie is reluctant to leave Philadelphia, and thus Rocky.

In Ukraine, Ivan Drago, the former Soviet boxer who killed Donnie's father Apollo Creed during a bout in 1985, has been living destitute since losing to Rocky that year, and seeks to regain glory. Assisted by promoter Buddy Marcelle, Ivan pits his son, Viktor, against Donnie. When Rocky refuses to support Donnie's acceptance of Viktor's challenge, Donnie leaves for Los Angeles.

Donnie and Bianca settle in a luxurious apartment in Los Angeles close to Donnie's adoptive mother and Apollo's widow, Mary Anne. As they adjust to their new life and prepare for the upcoming match, Bianca learns that she is pregnant. Donnie recruits Tony "Little Duke" Evers, son of his father's trainer Tony "Duke" Evers and later Rocky's trainer, to start training him. Overwhelmed by his life's recent developments, the underprepared Donnie rushes into the match and is badly injured. Viktor is disqualified for hitting Donnie while he is down, allowing Donnie to retain the World Heavyweight Championship. Nevertheless, Viktor becomes extremely popular in Russia and wins a series of fights with top billing.

His body and ego shattered, Donnie becomes increasingly disconnected from Bianca. Mary Anne reaches out to Rocky, who reconciles with Donnie and agrees to train him for a rematch against Viktor, who is suffering torturous physical tests at Ivan's hands. Bianca gives birth to a daughter, Amara, and Rocky is named her godfather; however, Amara is born deaf, inheriting it from her mother's progressive hearing disorder.

While Viktor taunts Donnie publicly, he faces constant pressure from his father behind the scenes, who enjoys the attentions of the media and various Russian delegates. At a state dinner, he and Ivan encounter Ludmilla, his mother and Ivan's ex-wife, for the first time in several years after she abandoned them following Ivan's loss to Rocky. Enraged at the sight of her, Viktor storms out of the dinner and chastises Ivan for seeking approval from those who cast them out. Meanwhile, Rocky and Little Duke retrain Donnie in a decrepit location in the California desert, focusing on fighting from within and training Donnie's body to absorb the heavy impact he will receive from Viktor in the ring.

In Moscow, the rematch is more balanced as a more controlled and focused Donnie exchanges equal blows with Viktor. Viktor is used to winning by knockout as his bouts have never lasted past four rounds; Donnie uses this to his advantage and willingly endures a heavy beating from Viktor, even after his ribs are broken. In the tenth round, Donnie unleashes sequences of effective blows and knocks Viktor down twice. Ludmilla departs after the second knockdown, upsetting Viktor, and Ivan sees the truth of his son's earlier words. An exhausted Viktor is cornered and receives multiple strikes without defending himself, but is unwilling to go down. Finally realizing that his son's safety means more to him than revenge or acceptance from Russia's elite, Ivan throws in the towel, forfeiting the fight to protect his son. He assures the distraught Viktor it is okay that he lost, and embraces him. As Bianca enters the ring to celebrate with Donnie, Little Duke, and Creed's other trainers, Rocky recuses himself and takes a seat to watch them from outside the ring.

Following the match, Viktor and Ivan later train together back in Ukraine. Rocky travels to Vancouver to make peace with his own estranged son, Robert Jr., and meets his grandson Logan for the first time. Donnie and Bianca visit Apollo's grave, where Donnie makes peace with his deceased father and the burden of carrying on his legacy, as he and Bianca introduce Amara, who now has a new set of hearing aids.

Cast 

 Michael B. Jordan as Adonis "Donnie" Creed: An underdog but talented heavyweight boxer, he is the son of world heavyweight champion Apollo Creed. His real name is Adonis Johnson, but he fights as Donnie Creed.
 Sylvester Stallone as Robert "Rocky" Balboa: A two-time world heavyweight champion and Apollo's best friend and former rival who becomes Adonis's avuncular trainer and mentor. He owns and operates an Italian restaurant in Philadelphia named after his deceased wife, Adrian.
 Tessa Thompson as Bianca Taylor: Donnie's girlfriend, who becomes his fiancée and the mother of his child. She is also a singer-songwriter with progressive hearing loss.
 Phylicia Rashad as Mary Anne Creed: Apollo's widow and Adonis's stepmother, who takes in Adonis as a child following the death of Adonis' biological mother.
 Dolph Lundgren as Captain Ivan Drago: Russia's former prize champion boxer, who, with the secret use of steroids and advanced training, gained worldwide attention due to his brute strength that had not been seen before. Years prior, he killed Apollo Creed during an exhibition boxing match, and was later defeated by Rocky. Having been disgraced in Russia, he relocated to Ukraine to raise his son Viktor, whom he also trained to box. Lundgren reprises his role from 1985's Rocky IV.
 Florian Munteanu as Viktor Drago: Ivan's son who is a burly and ruthless boxer, and Adonis's new rival.
 Wood Harris as Tony "Little Duke" Evers: One of Wheeler's trainers. His father, Tony "Duke" Evers, was a father-figure for Apollo as well as his trainer when Apollo became world heavyweight champion. He then became one of Rocky's trainers after Apollo's death. He trains Adonis for his fight with Viktor and later assists Rocky in training Adonis for his rematch with Viktor.
 Russell Hornsby as Buddy Marcelle: A boxing promoter who sets up the match between Adonis and Viktor.
 Milo Ventimiglia as Rocky Balboa Jr.: Rocky's estranged son, who moved to Vancouver in the period between Rocky Balboa (2006) and Creed and is now a father himself. Ventimiglia reprises his role from the former film.
 Andre Ward as Danny "Stuntman" Wheeler: A heavyweight boxer and Adonis's rival whom Adonis beats to become the heavyweight champion.
 Brigitte Nielsen as Ludmilla Vobet Drago: Ivan's ex-wife and Viktor's mother who left the pair during the latter's infancy. Nielsen also reprises her role from Rocky IV.

In addition, Robbie Johns appears briefly as Logan Balboa, Robert's son and Rocky's grandson. Archive footage of Carl Weathers as Apollo Creed is used throughout the film, with the actor's likeness also appearing through the use of photographs and murals.

Production

Development and writing
On January 5, 2016, Sylvester Stallone and Metro-Goldwyn-Mayer Pictures CEO Gary Barber confirmed to Variety that a sequel to Creed was in development. That month, Stallone posed the possibility of Milo Ventimiglia reprising his role as Rocky's son Robert Balboa from Rocky Balboa. Ventimiglia had revealed during the development of Creed that he was open to returning to the franchise, stating, "I'll tell you what, if they invited me, I'd love to be there. If they didn't, I wouldn't be offended." It was revealed in April 2018 that he had been cast. On January 11, 2016, Barber revealed that Ryan Coogler would not be returning due to scheduling conflicts with Black Panther, though he would return as executive producer. Michael B. Jordan was paid between $3–4 million, and his schedule was delayed by starring in Black Panther. In July 2017, Stallone confirmed that he had completed the script, and that Ivan Drago would be featured. In October 2017, it was announced that Stallone would direct and produce the film. However, in December 2017, it was reported that Steven Caple Jr. would instead direct the film with Tessa Thompson confirmed to reprise her role of Bianca, Creed's love interest. In January 2018, Romanian amateur boxer Florian Munteanu was cast as Drago's son, and Dolph Lundgren to reprise his role of Drago. In March 2018, Russell Hornsby joined the cast and Phylicia Rashad, Wood Harris, and Andre Ward were confirmed to reprise their roles from the prior film.

Vince DiCola, composer of Rocky IV, was originally rumored to return to score the film, but stated in a Facebook post: "I would have loved to return, however that's just how Hollywood works. We don't always get what we want."

Filming
Principal photography began March 2018. Filming occurred in Philadelphia, Pennsylvania, in the city's Port Richmond neighborhood, and was completed on June 7, 2018. Some scenes were filmed at the Grey Towers Castle at Arcadia University in Glenside, Pennsylvania. The Hospital scenes were filmed at Temple University Hospital's Boyer Pavillion at Broad and Tioga Streets.

Visual effects
The visual effects were provided by Zero VFX and Mr. X and Supervised by Eric Robinson, Dan Cayer, and Crystal Dowd with the help of Crafty Apes.

Music

Soundtrack

Release

Theatrical
Creed II was released in the United States on November 21, 2018. It premiered on November 14, 2018, at the Lincoln Center for the Performing Arts in New York City.

On December 21, 2018, it was announced the film would receive a January 4, 2019 release in China, the first Rocky film to ever receive a theatrical release in the country.

Reception

Box office
Creed II grossed $115.7 million in the United States and Canada, and $98.4 million in other territories, for a total worldwide gross of $214.1 million, against a production budget of $50 million.

In the United States and Canada, Creed II was released alongside Ralph Breaks the Internet and Robin Hood, and the wide expansion of Green Book, and was projected to gross $44–54 million from 3,350 theaters in its five-day opening weekend. The film made $11.6 million on its first day, including $3.7 million from Tuesday night previews (the second best pre-Thanksgiving total ever behind fellow release Ralph Breaks the Internets $3.8 million and marking a 64% improvement over the first film's $1.4 million preview total). It went on to debut to $35.3 million in its opening weekend (a five-day total of $55.8 million), finishing second at the box office and marking the best Thanksgiving opening for a live-action film, besting Enchanted ($49.1 million) and Four Christmases ($46.1 million). In its second and third weekends the film made $16.8 million and $10 million, finishing in third both times. Over the five-day Christmas frame (its fifth week of release), the film passed the $109.7 million domestic total made by the first film.

Critical response
The website's critical consensus reads, "Creed IIs adherence to franchise formula adds up to a sequel with few true surprises, but its time-tested generational themes still pack a solid punch." On Metacritic, the film has a weighted average score of 66 out of 100, based on reviews from 45 critics, indicating "favorable reviews". Audiences polled by CinemaScore gave the film an average grade of "A" on an A+ to F scale, the same score earned by its predecessor, and PostTrak reported filmgoers gave it an 87% positive score and an 89% "definite recommend".

Odie Henderson of RogerEbert.com gave the film three out of four stars, stating that "Creed II falls victim to the sins of sequelitis—it's bigger, louder and more grandiose than its predecessor—yet manages to right itself by not losing focus on the humanity of its central characters." Owen Gleiberman of Variety called the film "rousing and effective" and wrote "Creed II has been made with heart and skill, and Jordan invests each moment with such fierce conviction that he makes it all seem like it matters. Even if it all mattered a notable notch more in Creed." Eric Kohn of IndieWire gave the film a "B", praising Stallone's performance and saying: "Kramer Morgenthau's cinematography lacks the showy steadicam acrobatics of Creed, but the climactic battle between Adonis and Viktor still delivers a dazzling light show that dovetails right into the visceral mayhem of the battle, captured from so many angles some viewers may reel from the punches themselves."

Sequel

In response to the suggestion that Deontay Wilder could play the son of Clubber Lang in a potential Creed III, both Sylvester Stallone and Michael B. Jordan expressed interest in such a character being featured in the plot of the next installment. In February 2020, Zach Baylin was announced as the sequel's writer. In October 2020, it was reported that Michael B. Jordan would reprise his role of Adonis Creed, and have his directorial debut. Jordan was confirmed as the director of Creed III in March 2021, with a targeted release date of March 3, 2023, and Stallone confirmed in April that he would not appear as Rocky Balboa.

As of July 2019, the Rocky franchise as a whole was announced to continue with another mentor-student film like Creed and set after Creed II, in which Rocky Balboa befriends a young fighter who is also an illegal immigrant. Stallone stated: "Rocky meets a young, angry person who got stuck in this country when he comes to see his sister. He takes him into his life, and unbelievable adventures begin, and they wind up south of the border. It's very, very timely." In addition he announced the development of a Rocky prequel television series.

References

External links
 
 

2018 films
2018 drama films
2010s pregnancy films
2010s sports drama films
American pregnancy films
American sequel films
American sports drama films
African-American drama films
African-American films
American films about revenge
Films directed by Steven Caple Jr.
Films scored by Ludwig Göransson
Films set in 1985
Films set in 2018
Films set in the Las Vegas Valley
Films set in California
Films set in Los Angeles
Films set in Moscow
Films set in New York City
Films set in Philadelphia
Films set in Ukraine
Films set in Vancouver
Films shot in New Mexico
Films shot in Philadelphia
Film spin-offs
Metro-Goldwyn-Mayer films
New Line Cinema films
Rocky (film series) films
Films with screenplays by Sylvester Stallone
Warner Bros. films
2010s English-language films
2010s American films